The 1973 Anglo-Italian Cup was the fourth Anglo-Italian Cup competition. The European football competition was played between eight clubs from England and eight clubs from Italy and was the last professional Anglo-Italian Cup until it was re-incarnated in 1992.

Format
For the competition there were eight English teams and eight Italian teams. These teams were split into two groups consisting of four English and four Italian teams each. Each team played against the four teams in their group from the opposing nation. In each group, the best team from each nation progressed to the semi-finals. The semi-finals were two-leg matches played between each nation's group winners. The winner of each nation's semi-final then met in a final. Two points were awarded for a win and one point for a draw but, unlike the previous tournaments, points were no longer awarded for each goal scored. The draw for the group matches took place in Milan on 7 February 1973.

Group stage

Group 1 games

Group 1 tables

Italian teams

English teams

Group 2 games

Group 2 tables

Italian teams

English teams

Semi-finals
English semi-final

Italian semi-final

Final

Notes

References

Anglo-Italian Cup
Anglo-Italian Cup
1973